is a town located in Aomori Prefecture, Japan and a part of the Aomori metropolitan area. ,  the town had an estimated population of 2,311 in 1338 households, and a population density of 18 persons per km2.

Geography
Imabetsu is in Higashitsugaru District of Aomori Prefecture, and occupies the northern coastline of Tsugaru Peninsula, facing Tsugaru Strait.  It is surrounded by Mount Yotsutaki and Mount Maruyagata to the east and west, and faces Mimaya Bay to the north. The area of the town is the basin of the Imabetsu River, which mainly flows into Mimaya Bay, and the basins of the Nagakawa and Kurosaki Rivers. Much of the town is within the limits of the Tsugaru Quasi-National Park.

Neighbouring municipalities
Aomori Prefecture
Goshogawara
Sotogahama

Climate
The town has a cold humid continental climate (Köppen Cfb) characterized by warm short summers and long cold winters with heavy snowfall. The average annual temperature in Imabetsu is 10.2 °C. The average annual rainfall is 1249 mm with September as the wettest month. The temperatures are highest on average in August, at around 22.9 °C, and lowest in January, at around -1.4 °C.

Demographics
Per Japanese census data, the population of Imabetsu has decreased by more than two-thirds over the past 60 years and is now much less than it was a century ago.

History
The area around Imabetsu was controlled by the Tsugaru clan of Hirosaki Domain during the Edo period. After the Meiji Restoration Minmaya, Kanita and Tairadate villages were separated from Imabetsu, which was also organized as a village on April 1, 1889 with the establishment of the modern municipalities system. On March 31, 1955, Imabetsu annexed the neighboring village of Ippongi and was elevated to town status.

Government
Imabetsu has a mayor-council form of government with a directly elected mayor and a unicameral town legislature of six members.  Higashitsugaru District, contributes one member to the Aomori Prefectural Assembly. In terms of national politics, the town is part of Aomori 1st district of the lower house of the Diet of Japan.

Economy
The economy of Imabetsu is heavily dependent on commercial fishing and agriculture. Some of the locally caught seafood include sea urchin roe, sea cucumber, scallops, abalone and squid.
Imabetsu is known for Imabetsu-gyu, a type of wagyu, and Shine Muscat grapes.

Education
Imabetsu has one public elementary school and one public junior high middle school operated by the town government. The public high school operated by the Aomori Prefectural Board of Education closed in April 2022.

Transportation

Railway
 East Japan Railway Company (JR East) - Tsugaru Line
 Hokkaidō Railway Company (JR Hokkaido) - Hokkaido Shinkansen

Highway

References

External links

 

Towns in Aomori Prefecture
Populated coastal places in Japan
Imabetsu
Aomori metropolitan area